Laneburg is an unincorporated community in Nevada County, Arkansas, United States. Laneburg has a post office with ZIP code 71844.

Education
Laneburg is served by the Nevada School District. The former Laneburg School District merged into the newly created Nevada County District on July 1, 1985.

References

Unincorporated communities in Nevada County, Arkansas
Unincorporated communities in Arkansas